The European Review of Aging and Physical Activity is a biannual peer-reviewed open access medical journal covering the intersection of gerontology and exercise science. It was established in 2004 and is published exclusively online by BioMed Central. It is the official journal of the European Group for Research into Elderly and Physical Activity. The editors-in-chief are Yael Netz (Wingate Institute) and Wiebren Zijlstra (German Sport University Cologne). According to the Journal Citation Reports, the journal has a 2018 impact factor of 2.517.

References

External links

Gerontology journals
Publications established in 2004
Biannual journals
BioMed Central academic journals
English-language journals
Sports medicine journals
Online-only journals